Jazz re:freshed is a contemporary jazz record label in London whose roster includes Shabaka Hutchings, SEED Ensemble, Nubya Garcia, and Rosie Turton.

History
In 2017 the organisation appointed Yvette Griffith as executive director. Griffith had been with the organisation as a consultant since 2013, helping them to win Arts Council funding. In 2019, Griffith won the h100 award for services to music.

Jazz re:freshed promote and publish young British jazz musicians. They have run a showcase at the South by Southwest festival in Austin, Texas, for a number of years. Artists showcased at their 2019 SXSW event included Nerija, Joe Armon Jones, Sarah Tandy, Yussef Dayes and Ezra Collective.

Jazz re:freshed holds a weekly live residency, annual festival, and band development programmes. Their recording series 5ive showcases five tracks by a range of artists.

Current artists 

 Shabaka Hutchings
 SEED Ensemble
 Nubya Garcia
 Ty

References 

Music organisations based in the United Kingdom
British record labels
British independent record labels
Jazz record labels
Cultural organisations based in London
Record labels established in 2003